Carvel or Carvell may refer to

 Carvel, the fictional home town of Andy Hardy in the classic film series starring Mickey Rooney 
 Carvel, first track on John Frusciante's album Shadows Collide with People
 Carvel, Alberta, a hamlet west of Edmonton
 Carvel (boat building)
 the caravel ship type
 Carvel (franchise), a United States ice cream franchise
 Carvel Rock (British Virgin Islands), an uninhabited islet of the British Virgin Islands in the Caribbean
 Carvel Rock (United States Virgin Islands), an uninhabited islet of the United States Virgin Islands in the Caribbean

People named Carvel 

 Elbert N. Carvel, (1910–2005), American business and politician, Governor of Delaware 
 Tom Carvel of the ice cream company
 Philip Carvel, fictional character in Utopia (UK TV series) 
Jessica Carvel, fictional character in Utopia (UK TV series) 
Pietre Carvel, fictional character in Utopia (UK TV series)

People named Carvell 

 Frank Broadstreet Carvell (1862 – 1924), Canadian lawyer, businessman, and politician
 Garreth Carvell, English professional rugby league footballer
 Jedediah Slason Carvell, Canadian businessman, politician, and office holder
 Tim Carvell, writer for TV and periodicals